Andrea Mead Canning (born December 10, 1972) is a Canadian-American journalist and writer. She was named a Dateline NBC correspondent in October 2012 and contributes to other NBC News platforms such as Today, NBC Nightly News  and MSNBC. She also is a fill-in anchor and news anchor on Today and Weekend Today.

In addition to working as journalist, Canning is a writer for Hallmark Channel and Lifetime movies.

Early life and education 
Canning was born in Blue Mountain, Ontario and grew up in Collingwood, Ontario. Canning graduated from the University of Western Ontario with a degree in psychology in 1994. She also studied radio and television arts at Ryerson Polytechnic University.

Career
Her earlier assignments included work for WCPO-TV in Cincinnati as a reporter and co-anchor of the evening newscast.  From 1999 to 2001, Canning worked for WPTV-TV in West Palm Beach, Florida and from 1997 to 1999 was a reporter and anchor for CKVR-TV in Barrie, Ontario.  She was also the morning anchor for WXVT-CBS in Greenville, Mississippi. Prior to CKVR, from 1996 to 1997, Canning was an assignment editor for the tabloid TV show Extra.  While living in Los Angeles, she was also an intern for Baywatch and shared a house with future media personality and host Ryan Seacrest.

Canning was a correspondent for ABC News from 2004 until April 2012, where she covered the White House, Congress, the Supreme Court and the Iraq War for ABC's affiliate NewsOne. While at ABC News, she covered a wide array of stories ranging from crime stories and notable trials to the devastation of Hurricane Katrina and the Casey Anthony case.  Her public profile was elevated considerably after she interviewed Charlie Sheen for 20/20 on February 28, 2011. The interview was subsequently used as the basis for a viral video that received more than 10 million views during its first 9 days on YouTube.

During her time at ABC News, Canning contributed to Good Morning America, Nightline, World News with Diane Sawyer and 20/20, while regularly anchoring the early morning broadcasts World News Now and America This Morning.  Canning also served as an alternate news reader for Good Morning America.

Canning joined NBC News in October 2012, as a correspondent for Dateline while contributing to other NBC News platforms.

Canning has appeared in the role of a news anchor in the popular Ruby Herring Mystery movie series, beginning in 2019.

Personal life
Canning is married to Lt. Col Tony Bancroft, USMCR, an F/A-18 instructor pilot.  They have five daughters and one son:  Anna, Charlotte "Charlie," Christina "Kiki," Georgia, Elle and George Anthony Bancroft III.

She is a member of Alpha Gamma Delta, and was presented with their Talent of Leadership award in 2015 and their Distinguished Citizens Award in 2018.

References

External links 

American television reporters and correspondents
Canadian expatriate journalists in the United States
ABC News personalities
NBC News people
Toronto Metropolitan University alumni
University of Western Ontario alumni
People from Collingwood, Ontario
Living people
1972 births
Canadian women television journalists